Phiala similis is a moth in the family Eupterotidae. It was described by Per Olof Christopher Aurivillius in 1911. It is found in South Africa.

The wingspan is 47 mm. Adults are white, the wings beyond the middle with a common series of more or less connected black spots on the veins, but otherwise nearly destitute of black scales.

References

Endemic moths of South Africa
Moths described in 1911
Eupterotinae